Rani Padmini (1962 – 15 October 1986) was an Indian actress during the 1980s in Malayalam, Tamil, Kannada, Telugu and a few Hindi films. She entered the film field with Sangharsham and played notable roles in Parankimala, Sharam, Bandhanam and Kilikonchal.

She was murdered on 15 October 1986 at her home, along with her mother, by three of her employees.

Personal life
She was born to Chaudri and Indirakumari at Anna Nagar, Madras. She was their only child.

Death
On the morning of 15 October 1986, Rani Padmini's driver, Jebaraj, watchman Lakshmi Narasimhan alias Kutty, and cook, Ganeshan attacked her mother Indirakumari and killed her. Hearing her mother's screams, Rani Padmini came to investigate but was overpowered by the men and murdered. The three were, however, arrested and sentenced to life terms. Rani Padmini's murder caused ripples all over Tamil Nadu and Kerala and it was alleged that the three men were arrested in order to protect a high-profile person who was in close contact with Rani Padmini.

Filmography

Malayalam

  Bheekaran (1988).... Suma
  Vamban (1987)
  Karinaagam (1986)
  Annoru Raavil (1986)
  Idanilangal (1985)..... Subhadra 
  Uyarthezhunelpu (1985)
  Akkacheede Kunjuvava (1985)
  Akkare (Soorya Rekha) (1984) .... Valsala
  Ithaa Innu Muthal (1984) .... Nimmy
  Kilikkonchal (1984)
  Krishna Guruvaayoorappa (1984)...Sharada
  Nishedi (1984) .... Ajitha
  Kadamattathachan (1984) .... Bivathu
  Amme Naaraayana (1984) .... Naanikutty (Yakshi)
  Manasse Ninakku Mangalam (1984) .... Geetha
  Athirathram (1984) .... Naseema
  Ee Yugam (1983).... Madhavi
  Eettappuli (1983) .... Hema
  Naseema (Thamburu) (1983) .... Naseema
  Iniyenkilum (1983).... Rekha
  Bandham (1983) .... Sharmila
  Kuyilinethedi (1983) .... Chithra Thampatti
  Himavahini (1983) ... Sainaba
  Nizhal Moodiya Nirangal (1983) .... Leela
  Bheeman (1982)
  Sharam (1982) .... Anitha
  Vidhichathum Kothichathum (Kasthoori) (1982) .... Usha
  Anuraagakkodathi (1982) .... Mini
  Aakrosham (1982) .... Rekha
  Aa Divasam (1982)
  Marupacha (1982).... Rani
  Aasha(1982) .... Neena Cheriyan
  Kathayariyathe(1981) .... Usha
  Parankimala (1981)
  Thushaaram (1981) .... Shobha
  Thaaraavu (1981) .... Kaarthu
  Thenum Vayambum (1981) .... Aasha
  Sangharsham (1981) .... Lekha
 Vilangum Veenayum

Tamil
Pattam Padhavi (1981)
Krodham (1982)
Kaduvulluku Oru Kadidham (1982)
Anu (1982)
Kanavugal Karpanaigal (1982)
Pakkathu Veetu Roja (1982)
Villiyanur Matha (1983)
Niraparaadhi (1984)

Kannada
 Anurakthe (1980)
 Romanchana – (1987)

Hindi
 Prem Sandesh (1988).. (Released posthumously)

References

External links
 
 Rani Padmini at MSI

Actresses in Malayalam cinema
Indian film actresses
Actresses in Tamil cinema
Actresses in Kannada cinema
Actresses in Telugu cinema
1986 deaths
People murdered in Kerala
20th-century Indian actresses
1962 births